Kunštát is a town in Blansko District in the South Moravian Region of the Czech Republic. It has about 2,800 inhabitants.

Administrative parts

Villages of Hluboké u Kunštátu, Rudka, Sychotín, Touboř and Újezd are administrative parts of Kunštát.

Geography
It lies in the Upper Svratka Highlands. The Petrůvka stream flows through the town.

History
The first written mention of Kunštát is from 1279, when the owned of the manor and the builder of the castle was Kuna and the settlement was named after him. Lords of Kunštát held the manor until 1521. The most famous of the family was King George of Poděbrady, who was the owner of Kunštát manor from 1427 to 1464.

In 1678, the manor was bought by the Counts of Lamberg. The Lambergs had the Kunštát Castle rebuilt into an early Baroque representative family residence. The free lords of Honrichs of Wolfswarffen owned the manor from 1783 to 1901 and made a Neoclassical modification of the castle.

The last noble holders of the town were in 1901–1945 Counts Coudenhove-Honrichs. In 1994, Kunštát became a town.

Demographics

Economy
Kunštát has a long tradition of pottery which began soon after establishment of the town. A potters guild was set up in 1620, joining together ten local potters. The craft reached its peak in the 19th century. Pottery fairs are held in the town since 1993. Today, private workshops hold the tradition.

Sights

The Kunštát Castle is the main sight of the town. The original Romanesque-Gothic castle from the mid-13th century was rebuilt in the 16th and 17th centuries into the current form. It has preserved parts of all construction periods and is one of the oldest aristocratic castles in Moravia.

The castle complex is surrounded by a park and garden. Unique is the dog cemetery located next to the castle.

The Church of Saint Stanislaus Church is the landmark of the town centre. It was originally built in the 15th century and was rebuilt in 1687. Other sights on the square are a statue of George of Poděbrady from 1885, a Baroque house from 1756, and the rectory from the late 18th century.

The second church in the town is the cemetery Church of the Holy Spirit, which was built before 1670 and rebuilt in 1738.

In the local part of Rudka on the slope of Milenka hill is a complex with Burian observation tower and Blaník Knights Cave. It is a sandstone cave and underground gallery. Statues of the Knights of Blaník, including the statue of St. Wenceslaus, were created in the cave.

Notable people
František Halas (1901–1949), poet; lived here and is buried here
Ludvík Kundera (1920–2010), poet, dramatist and translator

Gallery

References

External links

 

Cities and towns in the Czech Republic
Populated places in Blansko District